Peter William Howells (born 9 August 1981) is an English cricketer. Howells is a right-handed batsman who fields as a wicket-keeper. He was born in Stockton-on-Tees, County Durham.

While studying for his degree at Durham University, Howells made his first-class debut for Durham UCCE against Durham in 2004. He made three further first-class appearances for the university, the last of which came against Durham in 2005. In his four first-class matches, he scored 111 runs at an average of 27.75, with a high score of 51 not out. This score, his only first-class fifty, came against Durham in 2005.

References

External links
Peter Howells at ESPNcricinfo
Peter Howells at CricketArchive

1981 births
Living people
Cricketers from Stockton-on-Tees
Alumni of Durham University
English cricketers
Durham MCCU cricketers
Cricketers from Yorkshire
Wicket-keepers